José Eladio Benedicto y Geigel (March 21, 1880 – July 24, 1924)  was the Treasurer of Puerto Rico, and briefly served as acting governor of Puerto Rico in 1921.

In his early life, Benedicto attended the University of Madrid, where he received a Bachelor of Arts degree. In 1902, he graduated with a law degree from the University of Michigan Law School and was licensed to practice in Michigan and Puerto Rico. He subsequently was appointed as a district attorney of Arecibo, Puerto Rico. He also worked as a law professor at the University of Puerto Rico.

In 1908, he was appointed as treasurer. During World War I, Benedicto was partly responsible for a campaign to advertise the sale of Liberty Bonds on the island. This plan would ultimately bring in nearly $10 million for the war effort, or approximately $9 per person in the territory. As treasurer, he also fought a legal battle against the Porto Rican American Tobacco Company. This battle eventually made it to the Supreme Court of the United States and they issued an opinion favoring the treasurer in 1924.

Shortly after Emmet Montgomery Reily was appointed as governor, Benedicto was indicted by a grand jury on corruption charges and was removed as treasurer by the governor in 1921. However, he was later acquitted of charges.

References
Political Graveyard: Benedum to Benito
COMMISSIONER DEFENDS PORTO RICO TREASURER; Davila, Replying to Gov. Reily, Says Benedicto Was Exonerated of Charges.
By Jose E. Benedicto, Treasurer of Porto Rico. Overland Monthly and Out West Magazine (1868–1935). San Francisco: Apr 1919.Vol.VOL. LXXIII, Iss. No. 4;  pg. 316, 4 pgs
The Red Triangle in Porto Rico By W. G. Coxhead, Secretary of Y. M. C. A. at Camp Las Casas. Overland Monthly and Out West Magazine (1868–1935). San Francisco: Apr 1919.Vol.VOL. LXXIII, Iss. No. 4;  pg. 343, 3 pgs

|-

|-

1880 births
1924 deaths
20th-century Puerto Rican lawyers
Complutense University of Madrid alumni
Governors of Puerto Rico
Puerto Rican lawyers
Secretaries of Treasury of Puerto Rico
University of Michigan Law School alumni